Zwackhia is a genus of crustose lichens in the family Lecanographaceae. It has six species. The genus was circumscribed in 1855 by German lichenologist Gustav Wilhelm Körber. He assigned Zwackhia involuta as the type species; this species is now known as Z. viridis.

The genus name of Zwackhia is in honour of Philipp Franz Wilhelm von Zwackh-Holzhausen (1826–1903), who was a German botanist (Lichenology and Mycology). He was also a Military Officer as well as being a landowner near Heidelberg. He was financially independent and owned large Herbarium.

Species
As accepted by Species Fungorum;
Zwackhia bonplandii 
Zwackhia circumducta 
Zwackhia prosodea 
Zwackhia robusta 
Zwackhia sorediifera 
Zwackhia viridis 

Former species;
 Z. involuta  = Zwackhia viridis
 Z. involuta f. taxicola  = Zwackhia prosodea

References

Arthoniomycetes
Arthoniomycetes genera
Taxa described in 1855
Taxa named by Gustav Wilhelm Körber
Lichen genera